Glen Quaich is a glen in Perth and Kinross and is situated almost midway between Crieff and Aberfeldy. The upper reaches of the glen approach Loch Tay to the west whilst to the south-east, the lower part of the glen contains Loch Freuchie. The glen then continues eastward before opening out onto Strathbraan and the village of Amulree.

The glen takes its name from its bowl-like similarity to a quaich, Scottish Gaelic , meaning cup or bowl.

External links
The Quaich Aberfeldy
Visit Dunkeld
Sporting Lets

Glens of Scotland
Valleys of Perth and Kinross